Outlet Creek is a stream in Pope County, in the U.S. state of Minnesota.

Outlet Creek was so named from the fact it is a lake outlet.

See also
List of rivers of Minnesota

References

Rivers of Pope County, Minnesota
Rivers of Minnesota